James Nares (19 April 1715 – 10 February 1783) was an English composer of mostly sacred vocal works, though he also composed for the harpsichord and organ.

Life
Nares was born in Stanwell, although soon after his family moved to Oxfordshire. His brother was a justice, Sir George Nares.

He began his career as Deputy Organist of St. George's Chapel in Windsor Castle, and was later appointed Organist of York Minster in 1735.  He married soon after that. Nares was a pupil of Bernard Gates (Master of the King's Choristers), Johann Christoph Pepusch and William Croft. His patron and friend was John Fountayne, the Dean of York.

He replaced his tutor, Gates, as chorister at the Chapel Royal in 1756. At this time the University of Cambridge bestowed the degree Doctor of Music upon him.

He was assistant organist at St George's Chapel in Windsor, then succeeded Salisbury at York Minster, before returning to the Chapel Royal in 1756 to become organist and composer to George III, succeeding Maurice Greene. It is believed that Nares was the first person to systematically publish a series of keyboard lessons for students of the piano.

Nares resigned his duties in July 1781 due to declining health and died 10 February 1783.

Nares is buried in St. Margaret's, Westminster. His service in F and many of his anthems are still used in cathedrals.

He was the father of Revd Robert Nares (1753–1829), the philologist and author.

Compositions
The Souls of the Righteous, 1734
Set of eight Harpsichord Lessons, 1747
Five Harpsichord lessons, Op. 2, 1759
Elegy on Mr. Handel, 1759
Il Principio or a Regular Introduction to playing on the Harpsichord or Organ, 1760, reissued in facsimile by Oxford University Press in 1981.
Six Fugues for Organ, 1772
Three Easy Harpsichord Lessons, 1778
A Treatise on Singing, 1778
The Royal Pastoral, 1778
Collection of Catches, Canons and Glees, 1778
Six Organ Fugues, 1778
Second Treatise on Singing, with a set of English duets, 1778
Twenty Anthems, 1778
A Morning and Evening Service and Six Anthems, 1788

Sources
 James Nares. Il Principio or a Regular Introduction to playing on the Harpsichord or Organ, a Facsimile of the Original Edition of 1760 with Introduction Notes by Robin Langley, London, Oxford University Press, 1981.

Notes

References

Sources

External links

 James Nares at the Nares genealogy project
 
 
 Hymn tunes composed by James Nares at Hymnary.org
 Ingenious Jestings Julian Perkins (Avie Records, AV 2152). The world-première recording of James Nares's Eight Setts of Lessons for the Harpsichord (London, 1747).''

1715 births
1783 deaths
18th-century classical composers
18th-century keyboardists
18th-century British male musicians
Cathedral organists
Classical composers of church music
English classical composers
English male classical composers
Masters of the Children of the Chapel Royal